is a 2D fighting video game for the Game Boy released by Culture Brain in 1996. It is part of the Super Chinese series.

Like Super Chinese Fighter for the SNES, Fighter GB allows players to participate in fighting game battles using characters from the Super Chinese games, including Jack and Ryu. The game has 12 different fighters. Players can use "super techniques" for their special attacks and block them using their "super defense." This game has a high level of animation and combat moves for a Game Boy game and it is possible to deliver combos that do more than 10 hits of damage.

References

Game Boy games
Game Boy-only games
1996 video games
Japan-exclusive video games
Super Chinese Fighter
Culture Brain games
Multiplayer and single-player video games
Video games developed in Japan